Joe Pass at the Montreux Jazz Festival 1975 is a live album by jazz guitarist Joe Pass that was released in 1975. It was recorded at the Montreux Jazz Festival in 1975.

Track listing
"You Are the Sunshine of My Life" (Stevie Wonder) – 5:12
"The Very Thought of You" (Ray Noble) – 3:22
"Nobs" (Joe Pass) – 4:07
"Li'l Darlin'" (Neal Hefti) – 3:15
"Blues for Nina" (Pass) – 2:51
"How Long Has This Been Going On?" (George Gershwin, Ira Gershwin) – 4:24
"More Than You Know" (Edward Eliscu, Billy Rose, Vincent Youmans) – 4:03
"Grete" (Pass) – 3:32
"Nuages" (Jacques Larue, Django Reinhardt) – 3:39
"I'm Glad There Is You" (Jimmy Dorsey, Paul Mertz) – 4:03
"Willow Weep for Me" (Ann Ronell) – 4:05

Personnel
Joe Pass – guitar

References

Joe Pass live albums
Albums produced by Norman Granz
Albums recorded at the Montreux Jazz Festival
1975 live albums
Pablo Records live albums